Kevin Michael is the debut album by American singer Kevin Michael, released by Atlantic Records on October 2, 2007 in the United States. Three singles were released from the album: "We All Want the Same Thing", "It Don't Make Any Difference to Me", and "Ain't Got You". Kevin Michael and his mother did a joint interview in the November issue of Sister 2 Sister magazine.

Track listing

"We All Want the Same Thing" (feat. Lupe Fiasco)
(Aimee Allen/Lupe Fiasco/Henrick Jonback/Christian Karlsson/Kevin Seward/Pontus Winnberg/Andrew Wyatt)
"It Don't Make Any Difference to Me" (feat. Wyclef Jean)
(Jerry Duplessis/Wyclef Jean/Kevin Seward/Andrew Wyatt)
"Can't Get Enuff" (feat. Shorty Da Kid)
(Jordan Johnson/Kevin Seward/Shea Taylor/Andrew Wyatt)
"Ha Ha Ha"
(Chastity Nwagbara/James Phillips/Kevin Seward)
"Vicki Secrets"
(Lester Mendez/Kevin Seward/Andrew Wyatt)
"Hood Buzzin"
(The Clutch: Patrick "J.Que" Smith, Ezekiel "Zeke" Lewis, Balewa Muhammad, Candice Nelson, Christian Karlsson, Magnus Wallbert, Pontus Winnberg)
"Ain't Got You"
(Andrew Wyatt)
"Stone Cold Killa"
(Jean Baptiste/Mike McHenry/Kevin Seward/Andrew Wyatt)
"Weekend Jumpoff"
(The Clutch: Patrick "J.Que" Smith, Ezekiel "Zeke" Lewis, Balewa Muhammad, Candice Nelson/J.R. Rotem)
"Love Letter"
(Brian Kidd/Chastity Nwagbara/Kevin Seward)
"Ghost"
(The Clutch: Patrick "J.Que" Smith, Ezekiel "Zeke" Lewis, Balewa Muhammad, Candice Nelson)
"Liquid Lava Love"
(Brian Kidd/Kevin Seward)
"Too Blessed" (feat. Q-Tip)
Kamal Fareed/Eric Hudson/Irvine Weldon/Muhammad Jones/Kevin Seward/Malik Taylor
"We All Want the Same Thing (Acoustic)" (feat. Akil Dasan)
(Aimee Allen/Lupe Fiasco/Henrick Jonback/Christian Karlsson/Kevin Seward/Pontus Winnberg/Andrew Wyatt)
"It Don't Make Any Difference to Me (Acoustic)" (feat. Akil Dasan)
(Kevin Seward/Andrew Wyatt)

References

2007 debut albums
Atlantic Records albums
Albums produced by Eric Hudson